Lustre or Luster may refer to:

Places 
 Luster, Norway, a municipality in Vestlandet, Norway
 Luster (village), a village in the municipality of Luster
 Lustre, Montana, an unincorporated community in the United States

Entertainment 
 Luster (film), a 2002 movie by Everett Lewis
 Lustre (band), American power pop band
 Lustre (musical project), Swedish black metal artist Henrik Sunding
 Lustre (Ed Harcourt album), 2010
 Lustre (Claire Voyant album), 2009
 Luster (novel), a 2020 novel by Raven Leilani

Software 
 Lustre (file system), a Free Software distributed file system
 Lustre (programming language), a synchronous programming language
 Lustre, a color grading software developed by Autodesk Media and Entertainment

Other uses 
 Luster (surname)
 Nadine Lustre (born 1993), Filipina actress and singer
 Lustre (mineralogy), a description of the way light interacts with the surface of a crystal, rock or mineral
 Lustre prints,  a photograph or artwork with a finish between glossy and matte
 USS Luster (IX-82), a yacht which served in the United States Navy as a patrol boat during World War II
 Operation Lustre, an Allied action in Greece in 1941 during World War II
 Lustre (treaty), a secret treaty  between France and members of the UKUSA Agreement for cooperation in signals intelligence
Luster (textiles), a property of textiles make them appearing bright, shiny and lustrous
 Lustre, English-language form of Latin lustrum - a period of 5 years

See also 
 Lusterware, ceramics with lustre glazes
 Lustral (disambiguation)